Xiao Jiaruixuan (born 4 June 2002) is a Chinese sports shooter. She won the bronze medal in the women's 25-metre pistol event at the 2020 Summer Olympics held in Tokyo, Japan.

References

2002 births
Living people
Chinese female sport shooters
Shooters at the 2020 Summer Olympics
Olympic shooters of China
Olympic medalists in shooting
Olympic bronze medalists for China
Medalists at the 2020 Summer Olympics
People from Shenyang
21st-century Chinese women